In enzymology, a lysolecithin acylmutase is an enzyme that catalyzes the chemical reaction

2-lysolecithin  3-lysolecithin

Hence, this enzyme has one substrate, 2-lysolecithin, and one product, 3-lysolecithin.

This enzyme belongs to the family of isomerases, specifically those intramolecular transferases transferring acyl groups.  The systematic name of this enzyme class is lysolecithin 2,3-acylmutase. This enzyme is also called lysolecithin migratase.

References 

 

EC 5.4.1
Enzymes of unknown structure